Marvel Superstars is an out-of-print collectible card game published by Upper Deck that released in North America in March 2010.the latest cards in Marvel series is the Uncanny X-Men  series are on sale from 5 July 2022. The cards and game play are inspired by films based on Marvel Comics characters. It is the first collectible card game to use characters from Marvel films produced by different studios. The card art features scenes from the films.

Game play
Marvel Superstars emulates battles between superhero and supervillain characters from the films. Each player selects a leader, which has 50 health. When a player's leader has accumulated damage greater than its health, that player loses the game.

In addition to the leader, each player uses three bases and his or her own deck of 50 or more cards.

Card types and teams
There are four card types: Leader Characters, Supporter Characters, Actions, and Resources

All cards except resources belong to a team. The teams are: Avengers, Fantastic Four, Marvel Knights, X-Men, and Villains.

Featured films
Iron Man
Iron Man 2
The Incredible Hulk
Blade
Blade II
Blade: Trinity
Ghost Rider
Daredevil
Elektra
Punisher: War Zone
Fantastic Four
Fantastic Four: Rise of the Silver Surfer
X-Men
X2: X-Men United
X-Men: The Last Stand
X-Men Origins: Wolverine

Product releases
Marvel Superstars booster packs contain 20 cards each. Cards have four possible rarities: common, uncommon, rare, or super rare. Super rare cards are foil. Each booster has 15 commons, including one leader and one resource, 4 uncommons and 1 rare or super rare.

Organized play
Upper Deck planned on running an organized play program for Marvel Superstars, including weekly local tournaments called Marvel Fight Nights, and an annual World Championship event. With the cancellation of the product however, there has been no news of such play being formally organised.

References

External links
Legendary Cardboard: The Premiere Marvel Superstars blog.

Card games introduced in 2010
Collectible card games based on Marvel Comics